Jelssin Donnovan Robledo Mena (born 3 November 1995) is a Colombian middle-distance runner specialising in the 800 metres. He won silver medals at the 2018 South American Games and 2019 South American Championships.

International competitions

Personal bests
Outdoor
400 metres – 47.11 (Tunja 2017)
800 metres – 1:47.31 (Lima 2019)
1500 metres – 3:59.82 (Cali 2019)

References

1995 births
Living people
Colombian male middle-distance runners
Pan American Games competitors for Colombia
Athletes (track and field) at the 2019 Pan American Games
South American Games gold medalists in athletics
Competitors at the 2018 Central American and Caribbean Games